The Grand Organ (described by its builder as The Voice of Jupiter) situated in the Royal Albert Hall in London is the second largest pipe organ in the United Kingdom, after the Liverpool Cathedral Grand Organ.  

It was originally built by Henry "Father" Willis and most recently rebuilt by Mander Organs, having 147 stops and, since the 2004 restoration, 9,999 pipes. An anonymous user publishes a tongue-in-cheek Twitter account supposedly written by the organ at @AlbertHOrgan.

The Willis organ 

The original organ was built by Henry Willis & Sons in 1871.  It had four manuals and 111 stops and was, at that time, the largest in the world.

Harrisons 
The Durham firm of Harrison & Harrison rebuilt the organ in two stages in 1924 and 1933. The organ was extended to 146 stops (including three percussion stops) and converted to electro-pneumatic action. It was still the largest organ in Britain at that time. The 2014 Pink Floyd album The Endless River, includes a track, "Autumn '68", featuring a recording of band member Richard Wright playing the organ in 1969.

In the 1970s, Harrisons refurbished the console and replaced the switchgear in the action, made minor changes to the voicing and added a roof in an unsuccessful attempt to project the sound forward. Composer Wendy Carlos featured the organ during the closing title sequence of the 1982 Disney science fiction film Tron, performed by organist Martin Neary.

By the end of the 20th century, the organ was again in a state of disrepair, with number of stops unusable due to leaks in the wind system, cracks in the soundboards, and other problems. By 2002, it was maintained only through "heroic efforts" on the part of Harrisons and could not be used at all without their staff present, in case of mishap. The wind chests and pipes were leaking noisily and wind pressure was insufficient to support full use. The leatherwork in the actions was also failing.

The Mander rebuild 
In 2002, the organ was taken out of commission for an extensive rebuild by Mander Organs.  Some consideration was given to restoring the organ to its original Willis specification, but the subsequent alterations and enlargements had made this impractical and it was felt that it should remain essentially as-is.

The dryness of the Hall had damaged the soundboards, so these were replaced and new and larger wind trunks provided.  The roof was removed, and the reed stops in the Great division were restored to their 1924 wind pressures. The 1970s split of the Great Organ (allowing two independent Great Organs to be registered and played simultaneously on different manuals) was rationalised, effectively offering separate Willis and Harrison choruses; also a Fourniture IV was added, bringing the total to 147 stops and 9,997 speaking pipes. For a few years the organ was once again the largest in the UK, until in 2007 the distinction passed to the organ in Liverpool Anglican Cathedral (10,268 pipes).

The organ was re-opened at a gala concert on the evening of 26 June 2004 with David Briggs, John Scott and Thomas Trotter playing, with the Royal Philharmonic Orchestra under Richard Hickox.  The organ featured prominently in the 2004 BBC Proms series.  The first recordings on the newly rebuilt instrument were by Dame Gillian Weir. The instrument has also been used by progressive rock band Muse when playing Megalomania, originally recorded on another Willis organ, at the church of Saint Mary in Bathwick.  During a live performance at the Royal Albert Hall on the 12 April 2008, Muse's frontman, Matt Bellamy, had commented that "since we're here, it would be rude not to play this beast".

Notable recordings 

In 2020, during the COVID-19 lockdowns, the organ was sampled by a recording team led by film composer James Everingham. Microphones were placed around the auditorium, including a binaural microphone placed inside the royal box. These recordings were then edited and developed such that composers can play the pre-registered organ as a virtual instrument within a digital audio workstation, using the Native Instruments Kontakt platform. Royal Albert Hall Organ was publicly released on 5 April 2022.

Stoplist since 2004 

 Couplers: I Choir to Pedal, II Great to Pedal, III Swell to Pedal, IV Solo to Pedal, V Choir (unenclosed) on Solo, VII Octave Orchestral, VIII Sub Octave Second Division (Orchestral), IX Unison off, X Swell to Choir, XI Solo to Choir, XII Reeds on Choir, XIII Great Second Division on Choir, XIV Choir to Great, XV Swell to Great, XVI Solo to Great, XVIII Octave (16′, 8′, 4′ stops only), XIX Solo to Swell, XXI Octave, XXII Sub Octave, XXIII Unison off, XXIV Octave Bombard (16′, 8′, 4′ stops only), XXV Bombard on Choir, XXVI Tubas on Choir.

Annotations

Reed stops are in boldface.

See also
 The Grand Organ of Liverpool Cathedral

References

External links 
 The organ rebuild as described by Mander Organs
 The Grand Organ of The Royal Albert Hall by Gillian Weir
 Henry Willis & Sons Ltd. Organ Builders (United Kingdom)

Individual pipe organs
Organ